

Buchanan is a locality in the Northern Territory of Australia located in the territory's west adjoining the border with the state of Western Australia about  south of the territory capital of Darwin and about  south-west of the municipal seat in Katherine.

The locality consists of the following land (from north to south) – the Malngin and the Malngin 2 Aboriginal Land Trusts and the Limbunya pastoral lease, the Kirkimbie, Bunda, Inverway and Riveren pastoral leases, and the Wallamunga and Birrindudu pastoral leases.

The locality's boundaries and name were gazetted on 4 April 2007.  Its name is derived from the Nathaniel Buchanan, a pioneering drover who first brought cattle overland from Queensland to the Northern Territory in 1877.

The 2016 Australian census which was conducted in August 2016 reports that Buchanan had a population of 55 people.

Buchanan is located within the federal division of Lingiari, the territory electoral division of Stuart and the local government area of the Victoria Daly Region.]

References

Populated places in the Northern Territory
Victoria Daly Region